Patapsco may refer to:

 Patapsco River, a large river on the western shore of the Chesapeake Bay, in Maryland, United States, forming the Helen Delich Bentley Port of Baltimore
 Patapsco, Maryland (disambiguation), two unincorporated communities in Maryland, one in Anne Arundel County and the other in Carroll County
 Patapsco Street, a small residential street in old South Baltimore, near Federal Hill neighborhood of Baltimore
 Patapsco Avenue, (Maryland Route 173), a major business/commercial/residential thoroughfare in the Brooklyn section in the southern part of Baltimore, Maryland, laid out in 1853. Divided into East and West Patapsco Avenues at the mid-way point of South Hanover Street (Maryland Route 2) - formerly First Street
 Patapsco (Baltimore Light Rail station), one of 33 stops at Patapsco Avenue, west of Brooklyn along the Baltimore Light Rail central line, running north and south through the metro area
 Patapsco Female Institute, a former girls boarding school in Ellicott City, Maryland, the ruins of which now form a background for a performing arts venue
 Patapsco Freeway, a southeastern portion of the Baltimore Beltway, Interstate 695
 Patapsco High School and Center for the Arts, a public high school of suburban Baltimore County in Dundalk, Maryland
 Patapsco Valley State Park, the first state park designated in Maryland stretching along the upper Western Branch of the Patapsco River, forming the border between Howard County and Baltimore County
 Patapsco Swinging Bridge, a pedestrian "swinging bridge" across the upper Western Branch of the Patapsco River in the "Avalon" and "Orange Grove" areas of Patapsco Valley State Park, west of Baltimore

Vessels
 U.S.S. Patapsco (1799), a sloop-of-war built in June 1799 on behalf of subscribing Baltimore merchants/citizens during the naval Quasi-War with the revolutionary French Republic at De Rochbroom's Shipyard, in Fells Point. Originally named the "U.S.S. Chesapeake", later sold after hostilities ceased in 1801.
 , a class of U.S. Navy tankers
 "U.S.S. Patapsco" (1862), a Passaic-class "ironclad" "Monitor" warship during the American Civil War in the United States Navy / Union Navy
 "U.S.S. Patapsco" (AOG-1), a World War II oil tanker